Roger Howe may refer to:
 Roger Evans Howe (born 1945), professor of mathematics at Yale University
 Roger T. Howe (born 1957), professor of electrical engineering at Stanford University